is a former Japanese football player.

Playing career
Uchiyama was born in Izumi on October 21, 1978. After graduating from high school, he joined Japan Football League club Montedio Yamagata in 1998. The club was promoted to new league J2 League from 1999. He played many matches as left side back and became a regular player from 2003. In 2007, he moved to J1 League club Vissel Kobe. Although he played as regular left side back in early 2007, he lost regular position behind Hiroto Mogi the middle of 2007. In 2008, he became a regular player because Mogi got hurt. However his opportunity to play decreased in 2009. In 2010, he moved to J2 club Ventforet Kofu. He played many matches as regular player and the club was promoted to J1 from 2011. In 2012, he moved to Vegalta Sendai. However he could not play many matches and retired end of 2012 season.

Club statistics

References

External links

1978 births
Living people
Association football people from Kagoshima Prefecture
Japanese footballers
J1 League players
J2 League players
Japan Football League (1992–1998) players
Montedio Yamagata players
Vissel Kobe players
Ventforet Kofu players
Vegalta Sendai players
Association football defenders